Nagabonar is a 1987 Indonesian epic war comedy film directed by M.T. Risyaf. It was Indonesia's submission to the 60th Academy Awards for the Academy Award for Best Foreign Language Film, but was not accepted as a nominee. In 2007, the sequel named Nagabonar Jadi 2 released.

Synopsis 
Naga Bonar is a pickpocket. During the withdrawal of the Japanese occupying forces from Indonesia in 1945 he declares himself a general of the Liberation Forces. However, soon a mask becomes his true self, and he becomes a true soldier and patriot.

See also
 List of submissions to the 60th Academy Awards for Best Foreign Language Film
 List of Indonesian submissions for the Academy Award for Best Foreign Language Film

References

External links
 

Citra Award winners
1987 films
Indonesian comedy films
Best Film Citra Award winners
1987 comedy films
Films shot in Indonesia